Vanderbilt University School of Nursing (VUSN) is a graduate school of Vanderbilt University, located in Nashville, Tennessee. VUSN is closely connected with its parent university and the separate nonprofit Vanderbilt University Medical Center. The School of Nursing is ranked in the top 10 in the U.S. News & World Report rankings. Additionally, its Masters of Science program is ranked 8th, and its Doctorate of Nursing practice program 6th in the report's 2022 graduate school rankings.

History 
VUSN has opened since1908, and was one of the first five schools to receive Rockefeller funding to implement the Goldmark Report of 1923. The school began offering the Masters of Science in Nursing (MSN) in 1955. It was one of the first to launch a pre-specialty program in 1986, which allows students who hold non-nursing degrees to enter the MSN program without repeating undergraduate classes. Vanderbilt's Bachelor of Science in Nursing degree, first conferred in 1935, was restructured into the pre-specialty program as one of several entry options.

In 1993, VUSN established a PhD in Nursing Science program. The Doctor of Nursing Practice program began in August 2008, which had an inaugural class of thirty-one students who graduated in 2010.

Education 
The school became exclusively a graduate school in 1989, with a mission of educating advanced level nurses. It has established MSN programs in numerous advanced specialty practice nursing areas. The school has multiple entry options for nurses and non-nurses, admitting students from educational backgrounds other than nursing and allowing them to complete a course of work leading to an advanced practice nursing degree. The school also offers a Ph.D. in Nursing Science—clinical research or health services research—and a Doctor of Nursing Practice (DNP).

VUSN offers the following MSN specialty programs:
 Adult-Gerontology Acute Care Nurse Practitioner
 Adult-Gerontology Primary Care Nurse Practitioner
 Emergency Nurse Practitioner
 Family Nurse Practitioner
 Neonatal Nurse Practitioner
 Nurse-Midwifery
 Nurse-Midwifery/FNP Dual Focus
Nursing and Health Care Leadership
 Nursing Informatics
 Pediatric Nurse Practitioner - Acute Care 
 Pediatric Nurse Practitioner - Primary Care 
 Psychiatric-Mental Health Nurse Practitioner (Lifespan)
 Women's Health Nurse Practitioner
 Women's Health Nurse Practitioner /Adult-Gerontology Primary Care Nurse Practitioner  Dual Focus

Vanderbilt University School of Nursing also offers these advanced degree programs:
 Doctor of Nursing Practice (DNP)
 Doctor of Philosophy (PhD) in Nursing Research
Post-Master's Certificates
Postdoctoral Program

Teaching affiliates 

Vanderbilt University Hospital
Monroe Carell Jr., Children's Hospital at Vanderbilt
Vanderbilt-Ingram Cancer Center
The Vanderbilt Clinic
Vanderbilt Bill Wilkerson Center
Vanderbilt Stallworth Rehabilitation Hospital
Vanderbilt Psychiatric Hospital
Vanderbilt Sports Medicine
Dayani Human Performance Center
Vanderbilt Heart & Vascular Institute

References

External links
Vanderbilt University School of Nursing
Vanderbilt Nurse

Vanderbilt University
Nursing schools in Tennessee